Nikos Bozionelos is a Greek-British academic in the area of Business Psychology. His early career contributions included a report on physical features and promotion rates of managers. Later contributions included establishment of the notion of prevalence rates for computer anxiety and demonstration of the digital divide. His name is nowadays mostly associated with research in careers. He is currently employed by Durham Business School of Durham University.

References 
Baruch, Y. & Bozionelos, N. 2010. Career Issues. In APA Handbook of Industrial and Organizational Psychology, v. 2: Selecting & Developing Members of the Organization. Zedeck, S. Washington DC: American Psychological Association. 67-113.|
Bozionelos, N. 2004. Socio-economic background and computer use The role of computer anxiety and computer experience in their relationship. International Journal of Human-Computer Studies 61: 725–746.|
Bozionelos, N. 2004. The relationship between disposition and career success A British study. Journal of Occupational and Organizational Psychology 77(3): 403–420.|

External links 
 http://www.dur.ac.uk/dbs/

Personal page 
 http://www.dur.ac.uk/nikos.bozionelos/index.html

Academics of Durham University
Living people
Year of birth missing (living people)